Kazi Shamsur Rahman is a Bangladesh Jamaat-e-Islami politician and the former Member of Parliament of Satkhira-2.

Career
Rahman was elected to parliament from Satkhira-2 as a Bangladesh Jamaat-e-Islami candidate in 1986 and 1991.

References

Bangladesh Jamaat-e-Islami politicians
Living people
3rd Jatiya Sangsad members
5th Jatiya Sangsad members
Year of birth missing (living people)